Gola Gokaran Nath Temple is a Hindu temple in Gola Gokarannath, Uttar Pradesh, India, and is also known as Shiva temple of Gola Gokaran Nath. It is a temple dedicated to Lord Shiva. The Gola Gokaran Nath is also called Choti Kashi.

History 

The story of Gokaran Nath is same as Vaidyanath. It is the belief of the people that Lord Shiva was pleased with the penance (Tapasya) of Rawana (King of Lanka) and offered him a boon. Rawana requested the Lord Shiva to go to Lanka with him and leave there forever. The Lord Shiva agreed to go on condition that he should not be placed anywhere on the way to Lanka. If he were placed anywhere, he would settle at that place. Shiv gave him one of the twelve Jyotirlingams. Rawana agreed and started his journey to Lanka with the Lord on his head. When Rawana reached the Gola Gokaran Nath (then called Gollihara) he felt the need to urinate (a call of nature). Rawana offered some gold coins to a shepherd (who was none other than Lord Ganesha sent by deities) for placing the Lord Shiva on his head until he returned. The shepherd (Lord Ganesha) placed him on the land. Rawana failed to lift him up despite all his efforts. He pressed him on his head with his thumb in full anger. The impression of Rawana's thumb is still present on the Shivling. Because of that the Shivling became like a Cow's Ear (गोकर्ण)and mounted around 5 feet below from the ground level.

Festival 

1. Chaiti Mela

In the month of Chatra (April) a great fair is organised for one month known as Cheti-Mela.

2. Saavan Mela

The importance of Gokarnnath dham increases during the month of Shrawan. During this period, lakhs of devotees throng the Holy Shiv Temple.

The legend says that when the churning of oceans - Samudra Manthana - took place in the month of Shravan, fourteen different types of rubies came out. Thirteen of these were distributed amongst the demons, except Halahal (poison). Lord Shiva drank the Halahal and stored it in his throat. Hence the name Neelkantha (meaning blue throat) is attributed to Shiva.

To reduce the strong effect of poison, Lord Shiva wore the crescent moon on his head. All the Gods, thereafter started offering the Ganges water to Lord Shiva to make lessen the effect of poison.

Since, this happened in the month of Shravan, since then the Shiva devotees offer the Ganges water in this month.

This pilgrimage continues during the whole month of Shravan for 30 days, during July–August every year. It is estimated that within this period of one month around 10 to 15 lakhs pilgrims visit Gokarnnath dham.

3. Bhoot Nath Mela

4. Maha Shivratri Mela

Places to visit (near Shiv Temple) 
1. Gokaran Nath Shiv Temple

2. Budhe Baba Temple

3. Sankat Mochan Hanuman Temple

4. Vishwakarma Temple

5. Chandrabhal Baba Satsang Sthal

6. Mata Parvati Satsang Sthal

7. Vinayak Dwar

8. Gokaran Nath Dwar

9. Nath Baba Dwar

10. Kartikeya Dwar

11. Teerth Sarovar Dwar

12. Teerth Sarovar

13. Neelkanth Teerth Maidan

14. Nath Vatika

15. Mela Sahayata Kendra

16. Maharshi Ved Vyas Yagya Mandap

17. Vishwanath Satsang Sthal

18. Ram-Janaki Temple

19. Radha-Krishna Temple

20. Shani Temple

Other temples in Chhoti Kashi (Shiv Nagari)

1. Bhootnath temple

2. Trilokinath Temple

3. Lakshmanjati Temple

4. Mangla Devi Temple

5. Phool Baba Ashram

6. Kalesh Haran Temple

7. Tedenath Temple

8. Gajmochan Nath temple

Photo gallery of Chhoti Kashi (Shiv Nagari)

References

External links
 Gola Gokaran Nath Temple - thedivineindia.com
 www.golamandir.com

Hindu temples in Uttar Pradesh
Tourist attractions in Lakhimpur Kheri district